Cindy Winckler (born May 27, 1950) is an American politician and member of the Iowa Senate for the 49th District. Previously, she served in the Iowa House of Representatives for the 90th District. She served in the Iowa House of Representatives from 2001-2013.  She received her MA from the University of Northern Iowa.

, Winckler serves on several committees in the Iowa House - the Appropriations, Education, Environmental Protection, and Human Resources committees.  She also serves as the ranking member of the Education Appropriations Subcommittee.

Winckler was first elected in 2000, defeating incumbent Republican John P. Sunderbruch.  She was most recently re-elected in 2010 with 3,342 votes, defeating Republican opponent Ray Ambrose with 69% of the vote.

Electoral history
*incumbent

References

External links

 
 Representative Cindy Winckler official Iowa General Assembly site
Cindy Winckler State Representative official constituency site
 

Democratic Party members of the Iowa House of Representatives
Living people
Women state legislators in Iowa
1950 births
University of Northern Iowa alumni
Politicians from Des Moines, Iowa
Politicians from Davenport, Iowa
21st-century American politicians
21st-century American women politicians